The Identity Festival is an American annual music festival that features popular electronic music artists. The festival tours various North American cities.

Conception
The talent agency William Morris Endeavor recognized the demand for electronic music and organized the festival and tour that promised fans of the genre a "full electronic music experience".

2011

Artist lineup 

 Aeroplane
 Afrobeta
 Avicii
 Booka Shade
 Chuckie
 Datsik
 Disco Biscuits
 DJ Shadow
 Doorly
 The Eye
 Holy Ghost!
 Jessie and The Toy Boys
 Kaskade
 L.A. Riots
 Modeselektor
 N.E.R.D.
 Nero
 Nervo
 Pete Tong
 Pretty Lights
 Rusko
 Skrillex
 Steve Aoki
 The Crystal Method
 White Shadow

Tour dates and venues 

 August 11: Indianapolis, IN @Verizon Wireless Amphitheater
 August 12: Detroit, MI  @ DTE Energy Music Theatre
 August 13: Pittsburgh, PA @ First Niagara Pavilion
 August 14: Holmdel, NJ @ PNC Bank Arts Center
 August 16: Charlotte, NC Verizon Wireless Amphitheatre
 August 18: Bristow, VA @ Jiffy Lube Live
 August 19: Camden, NJ @ Susquehanna Bank Center
 August 20: Boston, MA @ Comcast Center
 August 21: Wantagh, NY @ Jones Beach Amphitheatre
 August 23: Atlanta, GA  @ Lakewood Amphitheatre
 August 24: Tampa, FL @ 1-800-ASK-GARY Amphitheatre
 August 25: Miami, FL @ Klipsch Amphitheatre @ Bayfront Park (canceled)
 August 27: Houston, TX @ Cynthia Woods Mitchell Pavilion
 August 28: Dallas, TX @ Gexa Energy Pavilion
 August 30: Albuquerque, NM @ Hard Rock Casino Presents: The Pavilion
 September 2: San Diego, CA @ Cricket Wireless Amphitheatre
 September 3: San Francisco, CA @ Shoreline Amphitheatre
 September 4: Los Angeles, CA @ San Manuel Amphitheater – San Bernardino, CA
 September 5: Las Vegas, NV TBD
 September 10: Seattle, WA @ The Gorge

2012

Artist lineup 

 Adrian Lux
 Arty
 Audrey Napoleon
 Bingo Players
 Cole Plante
 Datsik
 D3FF & AKTEC
 Doctor P
 DVBBS
 Eric Prydz
 Eva Simons
 Excision
 The Eye
 The Gaslamp Killer
 Hardwell
 Jdevil
 Kerli
 Le Castle Vania
 Madeon
 Mighty Fools
 Nero
 Noisia
 Paul Van Dyk
 Porter Robinson
 Showtek
 Static Revenger
 Stephan Jacobs
 Wolfgang Gartner

Tour dates and venues 

 July 19: Cincinnati, OH @ Riverbend Music Center
 July 20: Detroit, MI @ Elektricity Festival Grounds
 July 21: Toronto, Canada @ Echo Beach powered by Rogers
 July 26: Mansfield, MA @ Comcast Center
 July 27: Bristow, VA @ Jiffy Lube Live
 July 28: Wantagh, NY @ Nikon at Jones Beach Theater
 July 29: Philadelphia, PA @ Festival Pier at Penn's Landing
 August 2: Atlanta, GA @ Aarons Amphitheatre
 August 3: Tampa, FL @ 1-800 Ask Gary Amphitheatre
 August 4: Miami @ Klipsch Amphitheatre at Bayfront
 August 10: Dallas @ Gexa Energy Pavilion
 August 11: Houston @ Cynthia Woods Mitchell Pavilion
 August 17: San Francisco @ Shoreline Amphitheatre
 August 18: San Diego @ Cricket Amphitheatre
 August 19: Phoenix @ Pavilion Amphitheatre

See also

 List of electronic music festivals
 Music of the United States

References

External links
 , the festival's official website

Music festivals established in 2011
2011 establishments in the United States
Annual events in the United States
Electronic music festivals in the United States